"Bring the Hook" is a song by American rapper YoungBoy Never Broke Again, released on January 12, 2022 as the lead single from his mixtape Colors (2022). It was produced by Karltin Bankz, Lastwordbeats, LondnBlue, D-Roc, and Jason Goldberg. The song received controversy for a diss toward the late rapper King Von.

Controversy
The song is notable for YoungBoy taking shots at the rappers from O'Block in Chicago, especially King Von, whose murder in 2020 is referenced: "Nigga, this that Squid Game, O-Block pack get rolled up / Murder what they told us, Atlanta boy get fold up".

After the song circulated on social media, rapper Lil Durk posted a picture of him sitting alongside a poster of King Von on Instagram, along with the caption "Don't claim it if you ain't do it you still a bitch." Rapper Lil Reese commented on the track that YoungBoy was "just rapping like the rest of these rappers all rap". Rapper NLE Choppa replied in agreement. A week later, YoungBoy responded with a diss track aiming at Choppa, "Know Like I Know".

Charts

References

2022 singles
2022 songs
YoungBoy Never Broke Again songs
Songs written by YoungBoy Never Broke Again
Atlantic Records singles
Diss tracks